LOFTI 2 ("LOw Frequency Trans Ionospheric Satellite", also styled LOFTI II) refers to a pair of United States Naval Research Laboratory satellites launched in 1962 and 1963 as a follow-on to the LOFTI-1 mission. The program's mission was to study how the ionosphere affected very low frequency transmissions. Both were 20-inch diameter aluminum spheres equipped with extendible antennas.

LOFTI 2 
LOFTI 2 was launched on 24 January 1962 as part of the Composite 1 mission alongside four other satellites. The mission failed to reach orbit.

LOFTI 2A 
LOFTI 2A was launched on 15 June 1963 alongside five other satellites. It was equipped with a ten-foot antenna which could be extended to 40 feet remotely. The orbital injection motor on the launch vehicle failed to fire, leaving all of the satellites in the wrong orbit.

References

Further reading 
 

Satellites of the United States